Giwargis of Christ (died ), also spelled Geevarghese of Christ and George of Christ, was an Archdeacon (Arkkadyakon) and hence the leader of the Saint Thomas Christian community of India. He was a biblical expert and a master of Syriac language and literature. He was considered a holy person but extremely efficient in administration. He was contemporary to Archbishop Mar Abraham of Angamaly. He is credited with the new construction of Marth Maryam Church Angamaly

The archdeacon during the first part of the reign of Mar Abraham was Givargis of Christ, who was on friendly terms with the Latin missionaries and was to be appointed the successor of Mar Abraham as metropolitan of India. Thus he should have become, according to the plans of Mar Abraham, supported by the Jesuits, the first indigenous Chaldaean Metropolitan of the St Thomas Christians. However, the last letter of Mar Abraham, where his requisition letter to the Pope to confirm Givargis' ordination as bishop of Palur and as his successor is dated 13 January 1584. While from another letter of the same Mar Abraham, we are informed that the consecration of Givargis failed because of the latter’s death.
Great mural paintings in the Angamaly Cheriyapally church are; "Hell" , "Last Judgement", also of mural paintings of the Bishops and the Archdeacon.

Givargis of Christ died in Angamaly. He was buried in the St Mary's Church in Angamaly. His brother Yohannan was Archdeacon (1585–93) and another brother Jacob became Archdeacon in 1596.

See also 
 Mar Abraham
 Christianity in India
 Church of the East
 India (East Syrian Ecclesiastical Province)
 Malankara Jacobite Syrian Orthodox Church
 Syrian Malabar Nasrani

References

 The Indian Church History Classics, Vol. I, The Nazranies (1998) and the Thomas Encyclopaedia Vol. II (1973).

1585 deaths
16th-century Christian clergy
Archdeacons
Church of the East in India
Saint Thomas Christians
Syriac Christians
Year of birth unknown